Michael Mohammed Ahmad is an Australian novelist, teacher and community arts worker.

Biography
Ahmad was born in Inner Sydney and attended Punchbowl Boys High School.

In 2012, Ahmad founded SWEATSHOP Western Sydney Literacy Movement, an arts organisation that promotes literacy in Western Sydney.  

In 2014 he published his debut novel The Tribe with Giramondo. Ahmad has stated he was motivated to write The Tribe in order to counteract negative stereotypes about Arab Australians that flourished in Australia following the September 11 attacks.

In 2017 Ahmad received his Doctorate of Creative Arts at Western Sydney University.

In 2018 he published The Lebs with Hachette, which was shortlisted for the 2019 Miles Franklin Award.

Ahmad was nominated for NSW Young Person of the Year in 2022, recognising both his writing and literacy work.

Bibliography 
The Tribe (Giramondo, 2014)
The Lebs (Hachette Australia, 2018)
After Australia (editor) (Affirm Press, 2020)
The Other Half of You (Hachette Australia, 2021)

Awards
Sydney Morning Herald Best Young Australian Novelists Award (2015) – winner
 New South Wales Premier's Literary Awards Multicultural NSW Award (2019) – winner
Aurealis Award for best anthology (2020) – shortlisted for After Australia

New South Wales Premier's Literary Awards Multicultural NSW Award (2021) – shortlisted for After Australia
Miles Franklin Award (2022) – shortlisted for The Other Half of You
Queensland Literary Awards The University of Queensland Fiction Book Award (2022) – winner for The Other Half of You
Voss Literary Prize (2022) – shortlisted for The Other Half of You

References

External links
 Michael Mohammed Ahmad: His new novel is likely to provoke plenty of discussion

21st-century Australian novelists
Living people
Writers from Sydney
Western Sydney University alumni
Year of birth missing (living people)